Alexis "Lexi" Jacobus  ( Weeks, born November 20, 1996) is an American pole vaulter. Lexi Jacobus has an identical twin Tori Weeks Hoggard, who is also a pole vaulter. Lexi qualified for the 2016 Summer Olympics by finishing third at the Olympic trials. Jacobus is the first woman to win 4 NCAA Division 1 pole Vault titles.

Lexi Jacobus, a four-time NCAA pole vault champion, seven-time All-American and five-time SEC champion for the Arkansas Razorbacks, has joined the University of Arkansas at Little Rock Trojans coaching staff. Derek Jacobus, Lexi Jacobus’ husband who was an All-American decathlete at the University of Arkansas-Fayetteville, is a University of Arkansas at Little Rock GA coach after previously serving as volunteer assistant coach. Lexi Jacobus will to continue training for the 2020 Olympics after graduating from Arkansas with a biochemistry degree and a 4.0 GPA while serving as assistant coach at University of Arkansas at Little Rock.

Global
Jacobus qualified for 2017 USA Outdoor Track and Field Championships.

NCAA
Lexi, Tori Weeks Hoggard, and Desiree Freier placed 1st, 2nd and 5th scoring 22 points for the Arkansas Razorbacks at 2018 NCAA Indoor Track and Field championships. In 2019, Lexi won the NCAA Indoor Championships, her twin sister won the Outdoor Championships.

Prep
Jacobus is from Cabot, Arkansas and attended Cabot High School. She set a national high school pole vault record in 2015 with a height of 14 feet, 7.5 inches Jacobus was honored by 2015 Arkansas Gatorade Player of the Year awards for Track and Field.

Jacobus cleared  in Black Springs, Arkansas and set the Pole vault American Junior record.

References

External links

Lexi Jacobus – University of Arkansas at ArkansasRazorbacks.com

1996 births
Living people
People from Cabot, Arkansas
Track and field athletes from Arkansas
American female pole vaulters
Arkansas Razorbacks women's track and field athletes
Athletes (track and field) at the 2016 Summer Olympics
Olympic track and field athletes of the United States